This article lists all rugby league footballers who have represented the Indigenous All Stars in the annual All Stars Match against the NRL All Stars. Players are listed according to the date of their debut game.

List of players
Playing statistics are correct as of 2019.

See also

List of NRL All Stars/World All Stars players

References

External links
 Indigenous All Stars at Rugby League Project

 
Indigenous
Players
Players
All Stars players